Kemal Özçelik (3 May 1922 – 9 August 2020) was a Turkish equestrian who competed in the 1956 Summer Olympics.

References

1922 births
2020 deaths
Turkish male equestrians
Olympic equestrians of Turkey
Equestrians at the 1956 Summer Olympics